Lycée Jean Mermoz is a French international school in Dakar, Senegal. It serves maternelle (preschool) until terminale (final year of lycée or senior high school).

The current campus opened on 19 November 2010.

See also
 Leopold Sedar Senghor French Institute

References

External links
  Lycée Jean Mermoz

Schools in Dakar
French international schools in Senegal